Little Tanaga Island is an island located in the Andreanof Islands of the Aleutian Islands of Alaska. It lies between Kagalaska Island and Umak Island.

References

Andreanof Islands
Islands of Alaska
Islands of Unorganized Borough, Alaska